FK Butel is a football club from Butel Municipality, Skopje, North Macedonia. They currently play in the OFS Skopje league.

History
Founded in 1980, the club achieved its greatest success during the 1999–2000 season, when it competed in the Macedonian Second League.

References

External links 
Club info at MacedonianFootball 
Club info at MakFudbal 
Football Federation of Macedonia 

Butel
Association football clubs established in 1980
1980 establishments in the Socialist Republic of Macedonia